Merritt Hayward Giffin (August 20, 1887 – July 11, 1911) was an American athlete who won a silver medal in the discus throw at the 1908 Summer Olympics. He also won the AAU discus title in 1910.

References

1887 births
1911 deaths
American male discus throwers
Olympic silver medalists for the United States in track and field
Athletes (track and field) at the 1908 Summer Olympics
Medalists at the 1908 Summer Olympics